Burgman is a surname. Notable people with the surname include:

Herbert John Burgman (1894–1953), American Nazi collaborator and propagandist
Marianne Burgman (1953–2021), Dutch politician
Mark Burgman (born 1956), Australian ecologist
Robert Burgman (born 1970), American climate scientist

See also
Bergman
Suzuki Burgman, series of scooters